Rhodope (Rodópi ) is one of the regional units of Greece. It is part of the region of East Macedonia and Thrace. Its name is derived from the Rhodope Mountains, which cover the northern part of its territory. Together with the regional units Evros and Xanthi, it forms the geographical region of Western Thrace. The capital of the prefecture is the city of Komotini. The second largest town is Sapes. Most of the Muslims of Thrace, the only officially recognized minority in Greece, are settled in this area, where they form around half of the regional unit's population.

Geography
Rhodope borders on the regional unit Xanthi to the west and Evros to the east, and on Bulgaria's Kardzhali Province to the north. The Aegean Sea lies to the south. The eastern Rhodope Mountains cover the northern part of the  regional unit. Apart from the mountainous areas, the territory consists mainly of farmland, forests and grasslands.

The southern and the central part have a mainly Mediterranean climate, and the northern part a mainly continental climate with cold winters.

Administration
The regional unit Rhodope is subdivided into 4 municipalities. These are (number as in the map in the infobox):
Arriana (2)
Iasmos (3)
Komotini (1)
Maroneia-Sapes (4)

In 2015 this regional unit has three seats in the Hellenic Parliament.

Prefecture
Rhodope was established as a prefecture in 1930, when the former Thrace Prefecture was divided into the Rhodope and Evros prefectures. In 1944 Xanthi Prefecture was created from the western part of Rhodope Prefecture. Since the 1990s Rhodope cooperated with Evros in the Rhodope-Evros Super-prefecture.

As a part of the 2011 Kallikratis government reform, the prefecture was transformed into a regional unit within the East Macedonia and Thrace region, with no change in its boundaries. At the same time, the municipalities were reorganised, according to the table below.

The Rhodope regional unit had 104,380 in accordance with the 2021 census results, a decline from 112,039 inhabitants in the 2011 census results. The capital of the Regional unit is Komotini which has an estimated urban population of 55,000. It is the largest settlement in the regional unit. It also serves as the capital of the Eastern Macedonia and Thrace administrative region.

Provinces
Province of Komotini - Komotini
Province of Sapes - Sapes
Note: Provinces no longer hold any legal status in Greece.

Sites of interest

 The ancient city Anastasioupolis-Peritheorion with the medieval towers south-east of Amaxades
 The Imaret of Komotini, one of the oldest Ottoman monuments in Thrace from 1360 - 1380
 The Papikio mountain with the ruins of early Christian monasteries
 The trip route from Arriana to the east, as far as the borders with Evros, within the forest
 The suburban forest of Nymphaea, north of Komotini
 The ancient Maronia
 The "Thracian Meteora" - scenic landscape with wild nature and wild horses north of Iasmos
 The circumcenter temple of 11th - 13th century of Maximianoupolis - Mosynoupolis few km west of Komotini
 Archaeological Museum of Komotini
 Folklore Museum of Komotini
 Byzantine Museum of Komotini
 Carathéodory Museum, dedicated to Constantin Carathéodory, in Komotini
 Thracian, Ethnological, Historical and Cultural museum, in Komotini

Beaches and resorts

 Petrota beach
 Synaxi beach
 Marmaritsa
 Agios Charalampos' beach
 Kangeles, near Maronia
 Platanitis
 Alkyona
 Proskynites' beach or Kryoneri
 Profitis Ilias
 Imeros' beach
 Karousmilou
 Molyvoti
 Chrysophora islet
 Glyfada's beach
 Paralia Mesis (with Blue flag 2014)
 Arogi's beaches (1 of them with Blue flag 2014) 
 Fanari beaches (2 of them with Blue flag 2014)

Gallery

Transport
GR-2/E90, Egnatia Highway, old and new, W, Cen., E, SE
GR-53

See also
List of settlements in the Rhodope regional unit

References

External links
Rhodope Internet Portal

Regional units of Eastern Macedonia and Thrace
1930 establishments in Greece
Prefectures of Greece